Porto Ceresio is a railway station in Italy. It is the end of the Milan–Porto Ceresio railway.

It serves the town of Porto Ceresio, with an easy access to the navigation on the Ceresio.

Services 
Porto Ceresio is served by the regional trains operated by the lombard railway company Trenord.

See also 
 Lake Lugano

References

External links 

Railway stations in Lombardy
Ferrovienord stations
Railway stations opened in 1894